Rafikul Islam Mondal   is an Indian politician member of All India Trinamool Congress.  He is an MLA, elected from the  Basirhat Uttar constituency in the 2016 West Bengal Legislative Assembly election as a Communist Party of India (Marxist) candidate. In 2021 assembly election he was re-elected from the same constituency as an All India Trinamool Congress candidate.

References 

Trinamool Congress politicians from West Bengal
Living people
People from North 24 Parganas district
West Bengal MLAs 2021–2026
Year of birth missing (living people)